R552 road may refer to:
 R552 road (Ireland)
 R552 road (South Africa)